SM U-82 was a Type U 81 U-boat of the Imperial German Navy during World War I.

She was launched on 1 July 1916 and commissioned on 16 September 1916 under Hans Adam. She was assigned to IV Flotilla on 21 November 1916, serving with them throughout the war. She carried out 11 patrols during the war, commanded from 30 April 1918 by Heinrich Middendorff. Among the ships she damaged was the USS Mount Vernon, the former SS Kronprinzessin Cecilie. At 18,372 tons she was one of the largest ships to be hit by a U-boat during the war.

She was surrendered to the British on 16 January 1919 under the terms of the armistice, and was broken up at Blyth between 1919 and 1920.

Design
German Type U 81 submarines were preceded by the shorter Type UE I submarines. U-82 had a displacement of  when at the surface and  while submerged. The submarine was powered by two  engines for use while surfaced, and two  engines for use while submerged. She had two propeller shafts.

U-82 was fitted with four  torpedo tubes (one at the starboard bow and one starboard stern), twelve to sixteen torpedoes, and one  SK L/45 deck gun. She had a complement of thirty-five (thirty-one crew members and four officers).

Summary of raiding history

References

Notes

Citations

Bibliography

World War I submarines of Germany
German Type U 81 submarines
Ships built in Kiel
1916 ships
U-boats commissioned in 1917